Jaak Uudmäe (born 3 September 1954) is an Estonian former triple jumper and long jumper who competed for the Soviet Union. He was the gold medalist at the 1980 Summer Olympics.

In 1979 and 1980, Uudmäe was acknowledged as Estonian Athlete of the Year. In 1980, Uudmäe's coach, Jaan Jürgenson, was nominated as the USSR Coach of the Year , and Jaak himself as the USSR Master Sportsman of the Year. He was the runner-up at the 1979 Soviet Spartakiad, behind Gennadiy Valyukevich.

His two sons, Jaanus Uudmäe and Jaak Joonas Uudmäe, are also both long and triple jumpers.

1980 Olympics
His victory at the 1980 Summer Olympics was adjudicated by an all-Soviet panel. Some observers later claimed that the bronze medalist João Carlos de Oliveira and fifth-placer Ian Campbell both produced multiple jumps longer than Uudmäe's, though the Soviet judges ruled all these as fouls, to protestations from the athletes and questioning by several observers. Uudmäe's longest jump was also ruled as a foul. In 2015, Athletics Australia made a request to the International Association of Athletics Federations to investigate the matter and review the outcome.

International competitions

National titles
Estonian Athletics Championships
Triple jump: 1976, 1978, 1983, 1986, 1988
Estonian Indoor Championships
Triple jump: 1975, 1977, 1978, 1983, 1985
Long jump: 1978

See also
Triple jump at the Olympics
100 great Estonians of the 20th century
List of Estonian sportspeople
List of Olympic medalists in athletics (men)  
List of European Athletics Indoor Championships medalists (men)

References

External links

1954 births
Living people
Athletes from Tallinn
Estonian sportsperson-politicians
Estonian male long jumpers
Estonian male triple jumpers
Estonian athletics coaches
Soviet male long jumpers
Soviet male triple jumpers
Olympic athletes of the Soviet Union
Olympic gold medalists for the Soviet Union
Olympic gold medalists in athletics (track and field)
Athletes (track and field) at the 1980 Summer Olympics
Universiade medalists in athletics (track and field)
Medalists at the 1980 Summer Olympics
Estonian University of Life Sciences alumni
Universiade silver medalists for the Soviet Union
Medalists at the 1979 Summer Universiade